Anders Edvard Ramsay (23 March 1799 in Kuopio – 12 May 1877 in Helsinki) was a Finnish civil servant serving in the Russian Imperial Army, and served as the General of the Finnish Guards' Rifle Battalion from 1829 to 1838.

See also
 Ramsay (Russian nobility)

References

Finnish generals
1799 births
1877 deaths
People from Kuopio
19th-century military personnel from the Russian Empire
Imperial Russian Army generals
Finnish people of Scottish descent
Finnish people from the Russian Empire
Barons of the Russian Empire